Quintana Roo is a 1984 horror novel by Gary Brandner. The novel is set in the Quintana Roo region of Mexico during the Second World War.

1984 American novels
Novels set in Mexico
Quintana Roo
Novels set during World War II